The American Breed is the self-titled debut album by the 1960s jazz-rock group The American Breed, released in the fall of 1967. Nine of the eleven tracks were cover songs, only "Same Old Thing" and "Short Skirts" were originals. The album spawned three hit singles: "I Don't Think You Know Me", "Don't Forget About Me", and their first major hit, "Step Out of Your Mind" (#24)

Track listing

Personnel

The American Breed
 Gary Loizzo – lead vocals, lead guitar, organ
 Chuck Colbert – bass
 Al Ciner – twelve string guitar
 Lee Graziano – drums, trumpet

Technical
 Bill Traut – producer
 Eddie Higgins – arranger
 Jerry DeClercq – engineer

References

External links
 The American Breed at Discogs

1967 debut albums
The American Breed albums